The Broadway Hotel is a historic hotel in Salt Lake City, Utah, United States.

Description
The 3-story building was designed by Bernard O. Mecklenburg and constructed in 1912. Original owners were Samuel and David Spitz. The brick building features a denticulated cornice and a prominent portico above the hotel entrance. The hotel was added to the National Register of Historic Places in 1982, and it is now a contributing resource of the Warehouse District.

Salt Lake City buildings designed by architect Bernard Ollington Mecklenburg include the Broadway Hotel, Holy Cross Hospital, renamed Salt Lake Regional Medical Center, and the Mecklenburg Apartments, renamed the Maryland Apartments.

See also

 National Register of Historic Places listings in Salt Lake City

References

Further reading
 Historic Downtown SLC Walking Tour (Utah Heritage Foundation, 2002), pp 39

External links

		

National Register of Historic Places in Salt Lake City
Early Commercial architecture in the United States
Hotel buildings completed in 1912